Henryk Brejza (born 20 December 1938) is a Polish footballer. He played in nine matches for the Poland national football team from 1966 to 1968.

References

External links
 

1938 births
Living people
Polish footballers
Poland international footballers
People from Ozimek
Association football defenders
Odra Opole players